Akia or AKIA may refer to:

 Akia Island, an island in northwestern Greenland
Saattup Akia, a mountain in Greenland
Akia Guerrier (born 1998), sprinter from the Turks and Caicos Islands
 Aircraft Kit Industry Association, abbreviated as AKIA
 Rescue toboggan or akia, a transport device for goods and people on snow and ice
Wikstroemia oahuensis, a Hawaiian plant also known as akia shrub, ʻākia, or Oʻahu false ohelo
AKIA, a secret greeting of the Ku Klux Klan